The women's 100 metre butterfly event at the 2018 Commonwealth Games was held on 5 and 6 April at the Gold Coast Aquatic Centre.

Records
Prior to this competition, the existing world, Commonwealth and Games records were as follows:

The following records were established during the competition:

Schedule
The schedule is as follows:

All times are Australian Eastern Standard Time (UTC+10)

Results

Heats

Semifinals

Final

References

Women's 100 metre butterfly
Commonwealth Games
Common